Lucius Valerius Potitus may refer to:

 Lucius Valerius Potitus (consul 483 BC)
 Lucius Valerius Potitus (consul 392 BC)
 Lucius Valerius Poplicola Potitus, Roman consul in 449 BC